The Gottlieb Schmitt House, located at 150 W. Poplar in Menno, South Dakota, was listed on the National Register of Historic Places in 1986.

It is a  two-story frame house built in 1888 around an original house that was built earlier.  It is significant for association with early German-Russian immigrant Gottlieb Schmitt, one of the first settlers in Menno.

In 2018 it is the Menno Heritage Museum;  it was purchased in 1983 by the Menno Historical Society.

References

Houses on the National Register of Historic Places in South Dakota
Houses completed in 1888
Museums in Hutchinson County, South Dakota